Ikarbus a.d. (Ikarbus - Fabrika autobusa i specijalnih vozila a.d.) is a Serbian bus manufacturer based in Zemun.

It was originally established as an aircraft manufacturer in 1923, under the name Ikarus. In 1954, it commenced bus production and since 1960 it completely shifted towards it. In 1992, it changed its name to Ikarbus.

History

On 13 October 1923, the company was established under name "Ikarus – the first Serbian airplane, car and engine industry Kovačević and Co", with headquarters in Novi Sad. The founders were Dimitrije Konjović, brothers Dušan and Milivoj Kovačević, Đoka Radulović and Josif Mikl. On 20 November 1923, "Ikarus" started business officially after the registration before the Novi Sad District Court. In the beginning, the company manufactured a number of foreign designs under licence, such as the French Potez 25, Czechoslovakian Avia BH-33 and English Hawker Fury; Bristol Blenheim as well as the locally designed Ikarus ŠM, Ikarus IO, SIM-VIII, Ikarus IK-2 and Ikarus Orkan.

On 3 March 1924, the first school type airplane "Brandenburg" was manufactured. In 1927, the Yugoslavian Air Command decided that "Ikarus" should start the production of military planes; the factory for the production of military planes was built in Zemun. On 20 June 1927, "Ikarus" together with Military and Navy Ministry concluded an agreement to build a new factory of airplane engines in Rakovica. In 1928, the Sports Club "Ikarus" was established, thus "Ikarus" being the first company to build gliders in the country. By December 1932, the company relocated its headquarters from Novi Sad to Zemun. In April 1935, the first model of war airplane of domestic design was completed; a single-seat glider "IK-1", designed by engineers Ljubomir Ilić and Kosta Sivčev. In January 1936, the Yugoslav Air Command and "Ikarus" signed an agreement for the manufacturing of British "Hawker Fury" fighter plane, of all-metal construction. By the spring of 1938, the Yugoslav Air Command and the company concluded an agreement on the supply of twin-engine bombers "Blenheim", under the British license. In 1938, the Administration Building of "Ikarus" in Zemun was built.

With the start of the World War II (WWII) in Yugoslavia, the Nazi Germany occupation authorities confiscated the company on 17 April 1941. On 17 and 25 April 1944, the factory was heavily damaged in the Allied air-strikes. By early November 1944, the factory restarted operations.

On 12 August 1945, the first emergency Assembly of "Ikarus" shareholders in the socialist Yugoslavia was held in. On 27 March 1946, "Ikarus" was nationalized by the decision of the District Court of Zemun. Until the end of 1946, the subsequent decisions in form of property nationalization were made. On 22 October 1946, the first plane "Aero-2B" flew for the first time, the first prototype made by the air industry in socialist Yugoslavia. On 23 January 1948, the Government of Yugoslavia made a decision to establish the State Enterprise "Ikarus". Also, the Sports Club "Naša krila" was established.

In 1950, a single-seat fighter plane S-49 was built by engineers Ilić, Sivčev, Zrnić and Popović. In the same year, "Ikarus" manufactured the first gliders in the socialist Yugoslavia; a single-seat glider "Hawk 1" was awarded the third prize at the International Championship in Sweden. By the end of October 1952, the first Yugoslav jet plane "451 M" took off. In 1954, "Kosava" twin-seat glider received the first prize at the International Championship in England.

From 1954 onward, Ikarus also commenced bus production, originally of Sauer and MAN designs under licence, but eventually the company's own designs.

In 1957, the airplane Ikarus S-451MM set the world speed record flying at 750.34 km/hour. In 1960, the Ikarus S-451M, ultra light jet plane set the world speed record, flying at 500.2 km/hour. On 14 November 1961, by the official act of the Administration for Military Industry Affairs, "Ikarus" ceased to be a military company. Most of the personal and equipment from the aircraft section of "Ikarus" had been relocated during the previous decade to a new aircraft factory SOKO, located in Mostar, SR Bosnia and Herzegovina.

In 1992, the company was privatized, and the following year changed its name to "Ikarbus", due to name usage conflicts with the Hungarian bus manufacturer with the same name.

During the 1990s Yugoslav Wars and international sanctions imposed on FR Yugoslavia, the company's production stagnated. As there was no political will to adjust a state-owned company to a transition, that trend continued during the 2000s and 2010s, causing Ikarbus to become indebted and work in limited capacity. In March 2019, the Chinese "Zhuhai Yinlong New Energy" company began the process of acquiring a majority stake in company's ownership structure.

Products

Every vehicle made by Ikarbus has a name starting with 'IK', followed by a hyphen and then the vehicle's code: IK-1xxs are solo city buses, IK-2xxs are articulated city buses and  IK-3xxs and IK-4xxs are coaches. Earlier IK 160(P)/161/166 models are also articulated buses. The letter N disambiguates integral models from non-integral ones.

Currently produced models under Ikarbus brand are:
 IK-103 solo, MAN or Mercedes engine
 IK-103 CNG (meets EURO-5 standards)
 IK-107 minibus, Cummins engine
 IK-112M, MAN NL 323  chassis
 IK-112N solo low floor, MAN engine
 IK-112LE, Mercedes-Benz OC 500 LE chassis
 IK-206 articulated, vertical MAN engine
 IK-218N articulated low floor, MAN engine
 IK-218M articulated low floor, MAN NG 363 chassis
 IK-308, midibus coach
 IK-312, regional coach
 IK-412, long-distance coach
 IK-415, three-axle coach

Historical

Aircraft

In 1927 an aeronautical section of the factory was found in Zemun where numerous planes were designed and manufactured, as well as under license. The factory included its own airfield. After the end of the World War II, in 1946, another two aeronautical companies, Zmaj and Rogožarski joined Ikarus as a wholly nationalised state aircraft industry. The Ikarus factory had manufactured in its workshops 475 aircraft up until 1962, when it stopped working for the aviation industry.

Buses
The historical models under Ikarus brand are:
 IK-4 (solo bus based on Leyland chassis, produced in the early 1970s)
 IK-5A / IK-5B (solo and articulated based on MAN Metrobus (de) license, produced in 1972-1981)
 IK-61 (solo, Raba D2156 engine, manual transmission) produced in the 1970s
 IK-83 (solo, FAP chassis, FAMOS 2 F-207 engine, manual transmission) produced in the 1970s
 IK-102 (solo, MAN D2866 engine, automatic VOITH transmission) produced until 1996
 IK-105 / IK-108 / IK-110B / IK-115 (solo, Raba D2156 engine, manual transmission) produced until 1988
 IK-111B (solo, MAN D2866 engine, manual transmission) produced until 1996
 IK-160B / IK-180 (articulated, Raba D2156 engine, manual transmission) produced until 1988
 IK-160P (articulated, SW680 engine ) produced for the Polish market until 1989
 IK-161B (articulated, MAN D2866 engine, manual transmission) produced until 1996
 IK-161R (articulated, Raba D2156 engine, manual transmission) produced until 1996
 IK-166 (articulated, MAN D2866 engine, automatic VOITH transmission) produced until 1996

The historical models under Ikarbus brand are:
 IK-101 (solo, MAN engine)
 IK-102 (solo, RABA engine)
 IK-201 (articulated, horizontal MAN engine)
 IK-202 (articulated, horizontal RABA engine)
 IK-203 (articulated, horizontal Mercedes engine)

See also
 Aircraft industry of Serbia

References

Footnotes

Notes

Bibliography

External links

 Official website (Serbian)

 
1923 establishments in Serbia
Aircraft manufacturers of Yugoslavia
Bus manufacturers of Yugoslavia
Manufacturing companies based in Belgrade
Serbian brands
Vehicle manufacturing companies established in 1923